This is a list of prizes, medals and awards including cups, trophies, bowls, badges, state decorations etc., awarded in Singapore.

National honours, military and patriotic medals
National Day Awards
Singaporean orders and decorations
Awards and decorations of the Singapore Armed Forces
Awards and decorations of the Singapore Police Force

Science, mathematics, technology
Defence Science Award
President's Science and Technology Awards
Tan Kah Kee Young Inventors' Award
ThinkQuest Junior Awards (defunct from 2013)
 Singapore Computer Society IT Leader Awards

Arts, heritage and entertainment

Art
Cultural Medallion
DBS Life! Theatre Awards
National Arts Education Award
Patron of the Arts Award
Young Artist Award

Heritage
Patron of Heritage Awards

Beauty
Miss Singapore Chinatown
Miss Singapore Universe
Miss World (Singapore)

Film
Silver Screen Awards
Singapore Short Film Awards

Journalism
ACCA Singapore Environmental and Social Reporting Awards

Literature
Golden Point Award
Singapore Chinese Literature Award
Singapore Literature Prize
Singapore Student Literary Award

Music
Singapore Hit Awards

Radio
Singapore Radio Awards

Television
Star Awards

Architecture and construction
Asia Responsible Corporate Awards
BEI Asia Awards
Construction Excellence Awards
SIA-ICI Colour Dulux Award
URA Architectural Heritage Award

Business and management
Enterprise 50 Awards - established in 1995, recognises local, privately held companies who have contributed to economic development in Singapore and abroad.
Singapore Enterprise Medal of Honour -By Singapore Enterprise Association (SEA)
British Chamber of Commerce Annual Business Awards - 8 categories across industries, and special recognition for Small businesses
Top Entrepreneur Awards
Asia Pacific Entrepreneurship Awards
Ernst & Young Entrepreneur of the Year Award
One Asia Awards
Asia Responsible Entrepreneurship Awards
International Management Action Award
 The NORNS Awards -  Excellence and Innovation Worldwide.
National Innovation and Quality Circles Award
People Excellence Award
Singapore Brand Award
Rotary ASME Entrepreneur of the Year Award
Singapore Business Awards
Businessman of the Year Award
Enterprise Award
Outstanding Chief Executive Award
Singapore Innovation Award
Singapore Quality Award for Business Excellence
Singapore Tourism Award

Education
National Arts Education Award
National Young Leader Award
Outstanding Youth in Education Award
Special Academic Awards
Prime Minister's Book Prize
Lee Kuan Yew Award for Mathematics and Science
Lee Kuan Yew Scholarship to Encourage Upgrading (LKY-STEP Award)
Masterplan of Awards
School Excellence Award
School Distinction Award
Best Practice Award
Sustained Achievement Award
Lee Kuan Yew National Education Award
Outstanding Development Award
Top 25 in school award
Academic achievement
Edusave Merit Bursary

Humanitarianism
President's Social Service Award

Politics

Sports and Games
Singapore Sports Awards

General achievement
 Excellent Service Award (EXSA), a national award that recognises individuals who have delivered outstanding service. It seeks to develop service models for staff to emulate, create service champions and professionalise services, managed by SPRING Singapore

References 
 

Singapore
 
Prizes medals awards